Pantabangan, officially the Municipality of Pantabangan,  is a 1st class municipality in the province of Nueva Ecija, Philippines. According to the 2020 census, it has a population of 31,763 people.

This is the site of the Pantabangan Dam and Lake.

Located in the northern part of Nueva Ecija, Pantabangan is located at the foot of Mt. Mabilog below Mt. Dalimanok which are found between Sierra Madre and Caraballo Mountain ranges. It is home to the Pantabangan–Carranglan Watershed Forest Reserve.

History
The place was discovered on November 30, 1645, by Fr. Juan Alonzo de Abarca, an Augustinian priest who with the 29th Spanish mission in the Philippines.

The village grew into a settlement and was officially included in the map of the Philippines in 1747. In 1900, Pantabangan formally became a town.

In early 16th to 17th centuries, the “Id-dules” (Aetas or Baluga) and Egongots (Ilongots) tribe inhabited the southern Sierra Madre and Caraballo Mountains. Pantabangan (Pantabanganan in early 18th century) may have came from the root Ilongot word "Sabangan or Sabanganan" that means "junction of water streams".  It was learned that most of the places in Central Luzon were derived from Ilongot word like Caanaoan, Puncan, Cadanglaan (now Carranglan), Kabaritan (Now San Jose City) and others. Bungamong (Bongabon) and Cadanglaan was formerly sitio of Pantabangan and Kabaritan also part of Pantabangan.

When the Second World War broke out, Japanese Imperial forces occupied the town municipality of Pantabangan in 1942 under the Japanese Occupation. During the Liberation, combined military forces of the Filipino troops under the Philippine Commonwealth Army and Philippine Constabulary units and the American troops of the United States Army and the U.S. Army Air Forces came, invaded and recaptured the town of Pantabangan and defeated Japanese soldiers in the Battle of Pantabangan and ended World War II.

In May 1966, the Old Philippine Congress passed the Upper Pampanga River Project Act (Republic Act 5499) authorizing the construction of the Pantabangan Dam and its appurtenant structures. The groundbreaking ceremony led by then President Ferdinand E. Marcos took place on June 11, 1971. The project was finally completed in August 1974.

The construction of the Dam had great economic and social impact on the lives of Pantabangeños. About  of productive farmland and the town center (East and West Poblacion) along with seven outlying barangays (Villarica, Liberty, Cadaclan, San Juan, Napon-Napon, Marikit and Conversion) were submerged under the new lake. Residents were relocated to higher ground overlooking the vast reservoir, which became the new Pantabangan town center. Before the expansion of the dam through the Casecnan Project in the 1990s, the belfry of the 18th century church resurfaced from the dam's summer low water level. During drought in 1983, some areas of the old town emerged.

Its power station generates 112 megawatts of hydroelectric power.

In February 1996, then President Fidel V. Ramos led the ground-breaking ceremony of the Casecnan Transbasin Project, a  tunnel from the Casecnan River in Nueva Viscaya to a terminal point at the Pantabangan reservoir and was commissioned on December 11, 2001. The project aims to augment the capacity of the dam to irrigate an additional  of agricultural land and generate an additional 140 megawatts of hydroelectric power for the Luzon grid.

The present Pantabangan town has 14 barangays and a total land area of about 41,735 hectares. The succeeding years since its relocation saw its progress from a fifth-class municipality in 1975, then to a fourth-class, then to a second class Municipality in 2006 and finally, in July 2008, pursuant to Section 2 of the Department of Finance Order No. 23-08, Pantabangan was reclassified as First-Class Municipality. It is the only town in the Philippines which boasts of three hydroelectric plants within its territorial jurisdiction.

Geography

Barangays
Pantabangan is politically subdivided into 14 barangays.

Climate

Demographics

Languages
Tagalog is predominantly spoken in Pantabangan followed by Ilocano dialect. People of Pantabangan "Pantabangenian" are also known for their very distinct strong Pantabangan accent, called "Adyu-ari".

Economy

Arts and Culture

The Pandawan Festival made its debut in April 2008, showcasing many local talents as well as other entertainments including Indigenouism art activities like art workshop and rural development thru art awareness programs. It features cooking contests, dance competitions and street dancing, and a parade.

Gallery

Notable personalities
Jason Abalos, a Filipino actor.

References

External links

 
 [ Philippine Standard Geographic Code]
Philippine Census Information
Local Governance Performance Management System

Municipalities of Nueva Ecija
Populated places on the Pampanga River
1645 establishments in the Spanish Empire